List of All-Pac-12 Conference basketball teams may refer to:

List of All-Pac-12 Conference men's basketball teams
List of All-Pac-12 Conference women's basketball teams